Mingin may refer to:

Mingin Township, a township of Kale District, Sagaing Division, Myanmar
Mingin, Burma, its principal town and administrative seat
Mingin people, an Aboriginal people of Queensland, Australia
Mingin language or Minkin, an extinct Australian Aboriginal language